Rayleigh Windmill is a grade II listed Tower mill at Rayleigh, Essex, England which has been restored as a landmark and is used as a museum.

History

Rayleigh Windmill was built in 1809 for Thomas Higgs, a timber merchant of Rayleigh. Higgs was bankrupt in 1815 and the mill was sold to William Hart of Woodham Mortimer in 1817. Hart sold the mill to George Britton in 1845 and the mill passed to his sons John and Samuel in 1869. £150 was spent putting the mill into repair. Thomas James Brown was the next miller, and the last to work the mill by wind c1907. The cap and sails were removed c1909 and the mill was worked by a steam engine then an oil engine and latterly by electric motor until at least 1937.

The mill was taken over for use as a museum by Rayleigh and District Antiquarian and Natural History Society, formally opening on 16 May 1970. The capless mill stood for many years with a crenellated top but in 1972 Rayleigh Urban District Council launched an appeal to restore the mill as a landmark. By the autumn of 1974 a new cap and sails had been made and fitted by millwrights John Lawn and Philip Barrett-Lennard.

In 2005, restoration work costing £340,000 was funded by the Thames Gateway South Essex Partnership.

Description

Rayleigh Windmill is a six-storey tower mill with a Kentish cap winded by a six-bladed fantail. The mill had two single Spring sails and two Common sails carried on a cast-iron windshaft. The tower has no batter until second-floor level, where the stage is. The tower is  diameter at base level and  internal diameter at the curb. The mill drove three pairs of millstones.

Millers
Thomas Higgs 1809 - 1817
William Hart 1817 -
Benjamin Ruffle 1840
George Britton 1845–1869
John & Samuel Britton 1869–1884
Thomas James Brown 1884 -
Green Bros 1937

References for above:-

Public access
Rayleigh Windmill is open from April each year on Wednesdays, Saturdays and Sundays.

External links
Windmill World webpage on Rayleigh Windmill

References

Tower mills in the United Kingdom
Grinding mills in the United Kingdom
Industrial buildings completed in 1809
Grade II listed buildings in Essex
Museums in Essex
Mill museums in England
Rochford District
Grade II listed windmills
Windmill
Windmills in Essex